The Arkansas–Arkansas State rivalry is a rivalry between the Razorbacks of the University of Arkansas and the Red Wolves of Arkansas State University. The rivalry stems from the long-time unwillingness of the University of Arkansas to schedule non-conference football games against Arkansas State University, primarily to marquee itself as the state's premier university athletics program. The Razorbacks play in the Southeastern Conference while the Red Wolves primarily play in the Sun Belt Conference.

After decades of speculation, many of the programs both universities sponsor began scheduling non-football games against each other in the 2020s, after clearance from the Arkansas Athletic Director in June 2020. In February 2021, it was announced the two schools would play each other in football at the neutral-site War Memorial Stadium in the state capital, Little Rock.

Results

Baseball

Men's basketball

Women's basketball 

Source:

Football

Women's soccer

Notes

References 

College basketball rivalries in the United States
College baseball rivalries in the United States
College football rivalries in the United States
College soccer rivalries in the United States
College sports rivalries in the United States
College sports in Arkansas
Arkansas Razorbacks
Arkansas State Red Wolves
2021 establishments in Arkansas